Ilya Viktorovich Ionov (born 27 July 1985) is a Russian former professional football player who played as a defender.

Club career
Started player career in second russian league Russian Professional Football League with FC Torpedo Volzhsky like his father Viktor Ionov at 2004.

He made his Russian Football National League debut for FC Rotor Volgograd on 27 March 2010 in a game against FC Volga Nizhny Novgorod.

Played with FC Rotor Volgograd until 2013, and moved to FC Torpedo Armavir, returned to Rotor at 2015. After Rotor reorganisation played one season at FC Karelia Petrozavodsk. When Rotor return to Russian Football National League, returned to club.

Family
Viktor Ionov, father, football player.

Maxim Ionov, brother, football player.

External links
 

1985 births
People from Volzhsky, Volgograd Oblast
Living people
Russian footballers
Association football defenders
FC Energiya Volzhsky players
FC Rotor Volgograd players
FC Armavir players
FC Dynamo Stavropol players
Sportspeople from Volgograd Oblast